USS Implicit (AM-455/MSO-455) was an Agile-class minesweeper acquired by the U.S. Navy for the task of removing mines that had been placed in the water to prevent the safe passage of ships.

Implicit was launched by Wilmington Boat Works, Wilmington, California 1 August 1953; sponsored by Mrs. Landon Horton, and commissioned 10 March 1954.

West Coast deployment 

One of a class of new minesweepers constructed entirely of nonmagnetic materials, Implicit conducted shakedown training in California waters during mid-1954. She then began an operational pattern which was to continue for three years: minesweeping exercises, fleet maneuvers, and training cruises in the California-Mexico area. The ship then got underway from her home port, Long Beach, California, 7 August 1957 to join the U.S. 7th Fleet in the strategic Far East. During this deployment, Implicit operated with Japanese ships, Nationalist Chinese minesweepers, and with regular units of the U.S. 7th Fleet on their daily mission of maintaining peace and security in the area. She returned to Long Beach 1 March 1958.

Second Far East cruise 

Training and readiness exercises out of Long Beach occupied the minesweeper until her second cruise to the Far East. She steamed out of Long Beach 8 January 1960 and during six months in the western Pacific Ocean took part in mine warfare exercises with 7th Fleet ships in the Philippines and off Okinawa. Implicit arrived Long Beach after this cruise 17 July 1960.

Participating in joint U.S.-Canadian exercises 

Training operations and mine countermeasures drill were carried out until August 1961, when the veteran minecraft took part in joint American-Canadian mine-sweeping exercises off British Columbia.

Supporting Vietnam operations 

Returning to Long Beach, the ship prepared for another Far Eastern deployment, this time in support of the American advisory effort in South Vietnam. Sailing 2 January 1962 for this embattled country, Implicit first participated in SEATO maneuvers and then moved to various ports in South Vietnam to assist in training officers and men. She returned to Long Beach from South Vietnam 17 August 1962.

Joint exercises with the Taiwanese Navy 

Implicit resumed a schedule of underway training and fleet exercises out of Long Beach until her next deployment, sailing with her division 3 January 1964. Stopping at Guam and Midway Island en route, she arrived off Formosa for mine-warfare exercises in March. In May she returned to the Formosa Strait for a second operation, in which the ship acted under a Chinese Nationalist division commander in a demonstration of cooperation and smooth combined operations. Following her second SEATO exercise in the Pacific, Implicit resumed to Long Beach 28 July 1964 for a yard overhaul and readiness tactics and training along the coast of California.

Supporting Operation Market Time 

Implicit departed Long Beach 21 September 1965 for the Far East. A unit of Mine Division 91, she joined the "Market Time Patrol" along Vietnam's 1,000-mile coastline to intercept Vietcong men and supplies trying to infiltrate into South Vietnam. Once she was fired on by Vietcong while cruising close to shore and retaliated with her 40mm. and other machineguns.

After a 2-week stopover, Implicit departed Kaohsiung, Taiwan, 14 January to continue her "Market Time" patrols into late 1966. By 15 March she had boarded more than 1,000 junks and sampans for inspection. On 22 and 23 March, the minesweeper fired nearly 700 rounds of 40mm. ammunition supporting small South Vietnamese naval craft under fire from enemy shore batteries. On 28 June Implicit got underway with a mine division for Long Beach, California, via Guam, Kwajalein, and Pearl Harbor arriving Long Beach, 2 August From 13 to 20 September she participated in minesweeping Operation Eager Angler off Santa; Rosa Island. Implicit joined a carrier task unit for Operation COMPTUEX through December and then continued training operations off Long Beach into 1967.

Decommissioning 

Implicit was decommissioned 30 September 1994 and handed over to Taiwan Navy among 3 other mine sweepers. She is still in service with ROC Navy.

She was the last wooden ship in the Navy that carried a full inspection cycle.

References

External links 
 NavSource Online: Mine Warfare Vessel Photo Archive - Implicit (MSO 455) - ex-AM-455
 

 

Agile-class minesweepers
Ships built in Los Angeles
1953 ships
Cold War minesweepers of the United States
Vietnam War minesweepers of the United States
Yung Yang-class minesweepers
Minesweepers of the Republic of China